The 1942–43 season in Swedish football, starting August 1942 and ending July 1943:

Honours

Official titles

Competitions

Promotions, relegations and qualifications

Promotions

League transfers

Relegations

Domestic results

Allsvenskan 1942–43

Allsvenskan promotion play-off 1942–43

Division 2 Norra 1942–43

Division 2 Östra 1942–43

Division 2 Västra 1942–43

Division 2 Södra 1942–43

Division 2 promotion play-off 1942–43 
1st round

2nd round

Norrländska Mästerskapet 1943 
Final

Svenska Cupen 1942 
Final

National team results 

 Sweden: 

 Sweden: 

 Sweden: 

 Sweden: 

 Sweden:

National team players in season 1942/43

Notes

References 
Print

Online

 
Seasons in Swedish football